WRNM (91.7 FM) is a radio station licensed to Ellsworth, Maine, United States.  The station is owned by Light of Life Ministries. In March 2012 the station signed on simulcasting Augusta based WMDR-FM. In June 2019, they completed a station upgrade, increasing height, power, and station class at the same location. This upgrade changed their antenna from omnidirectional to a directional antenna that minimizes power towards WMEB-FM.

References

External links
 

Ellsworth, Maine
Gospel radio stations in the United States
Radio stations established in 2012
Southern Gospel radio stations in the United States
RNM